Łącznościowiec Szczecin is a Polish women's handball team, based in Szczecin.

See also 

 Handball in Poland
 Sports in Poland

Polish handball clubs
Sport in Szczecin